Giovanni Antonio Salvatore Orgiazzi, also called Antonio il Vecchio, (4 July 1709 – 17 May 1788) was an Italian painter active mainly in the Valselsia, including at Varallo and Vercelli.

Biography
He was born and died in Varallo. He painted for the Sacro Monte di Varallo (1728-1731); the Sacro Monte di Orta (1731); the church of San Giacomo at Varallo; the Sanctuary of the Madonna della Fontana at Azoglio of Crevacuore; and the church of San Pietro e Paolo at Boccioleto. He was the father of Rocco Orgiazzi, also a painter. Rocco's son, Giacomo Orgiazzi was an engraver and cartographer.

References

1709 births
1788 deaths
People from Varallo Sesia
18th-century Italian painters
Italian male painters
18th-century Italian male artists